Dorset County Cricket Club was formed in 1896, and first competed in the Minor Counties Championship in 1897.  Their first appearance in List A cricket was in 1968, and in total they have played twenty matches, making two Gillette Cup, thirteen NatWest Trophy and five Cheltenham & Gloucester Trophy appearances. On five occasions the county progressed to the second round of the competition: in 1999, 2000, 2001, 2002, and 2004 and only once did it progress beyond to the third round, in 2000. Minor counties teams were excluded from the competition from the 2006 season; Dorset's last match was against Yorkshire in the first round of the 2004 competition.

In their twenty List A matches, 88 players have represented Dorset. Stuart Rintoul has appeared the most times for the county, playing in ten matches.  Graeme Calway recorded the highest score in List A cricket for Dorset, scoring 105 runs against Hampshire in 1992. Jon Hardy, who also during his career played 142 first-class matches is Dorset's leading run-scorer, having scored 217 runs in his four appearances for the county.  Vyvian Pike's nine wickets for the county is the most by any player, as well as having the best bowling figures, having taken five wickets against Norfolk in 2000. Martin Miller, who appeared for Dorset on seven occasions, has claimed the most dismissals as wicket-keeper, taking six catches and making two stumpings. Five non-English players have appeared for Dorset; Guernsey's Lee Savident, Scotland's Ian Sanders and South Africa's Andrew Hodgson, Ian Stuart and Lloyd Ferreira.

The players in this list have all played at least one List A match.  Dorset cricketers who have not represented the county in List A cricket are not included in the list. Players are initially listed in order of appearance; where players made their debut in the same match, they are initially listed by batting order.

Key

List of players

List A captains

References

Notes

Dorset County Cricket Club
Dorset
Cricketers